In ordinary computer programming, the programmer keeps the program's intended results in mind and painstakingly constructs a computer program to achieve those results. Inferential programming refers to (still mostly hypothetical) techniques and technologies enabling the inverse. Inferential programming would allow the programmer to describe the intended result to the computer using a metaphor such as a fitness function, a test specification, or a logical specification and then the computer would construct its own program to meet the supplied criteria.

During the 1980s, approaches to achieve inferential programming mostly revolved around techniques for logical inference. Today the term is sometimes used in connection with evolutionary computation techniques that enable the computer to evolve a solution in response to a problem posed as a fitness or reward function.

In July of 2022 GitHub Copilot was released, which is an example of inferential programming.

Closely related concepts and technologies
PROLOG
Constraint programming
Artificial intelligence
Genetic programming
Machine learning
Artificial life
Evolution
Metaprogramming
Logic programming

See also
Automated reasoning
Compiler theory
Unit testing

References

External links
First steps towards inferential programming

Programming paradigms